Edgardo Pailos Rugna (born August 15, 1967) is a former field hockey player from Argentina. He competed for his native country at the 1996 Summer Olympics, where he finished in ninth place with the national squad. He won the gold medal at the 1995 Pan American Games, and made his Olympic debut at the 1988 Summer Olympics in Seoul, South Korea.

References

External links
 

1967 births
Living people
Argentine male field hockey players
Field hockey players at the 1988 Summer Olympics
Field hockey players at the 1992 Summer Olympics
Field hockey players at the 1996 Summer Olympics
Olympic field hockey players of Argentina
Pan American Games gold medalists for Argentina
Pan American Games medalists in field hockey
Field hockey players at the 1991 Pan American Games
Field hockey players at the 1995 Pan American Games
1990 Men's Hockey World Cup players
Medalists at the 1995 Pan American Games
Medalists at the 1991 Pan American Games
20th-century Argentine people